The Lexus and the Olive Tree: Understanding Globalization is a 1999 book by Thomas L. Friedman that posits that the world is currently undergoing two struggles: the drive for prosperity and development, symbolized by the Lexus LS, and the desire to retain identity and traditions, symbolized by the olive tree.

Narrative 
Friedman explains "globalization" by recounting stories of his actual experiences in interfacing with many of the global movers and shakers. He proposes that "globalization is not simply a trend or fad but is, rather, an international system. It is the system that has replaced the old Cold War system, and, like that Cold War System, globalization has its own rules and logic that today directly or indirectly influence the politics, environment, geopolitics and economics of virtually every country in the world."

The "Big Idea" in The Lexus and the Olive Tree is found on page 223 where Friedman explains that: "if you can't see the world, and you can't see the interactions that are shaping the world, you surely cannot strategize about the world." He states that "you need a strategy for how to choose prosperity for your country or company."

Golden Arches theory
The book puts forward a capitalist peace theory, first published as an opinion piece in The New York Times in December 1996, called the Golden Arches Theory of Conflict Prevention; although slightly tongue-in-cheek, it states:

No two countries that both have a McDonald's have ever fought a war against each other.

He supported that observation, as a theory, by stating that when a country has reached an economic development where it has a middle class strong enough to support a McDonald's network, it would become a "McDonald's country", and will not be interested in fighting wars anymore.

Friedman's point is that due to globalization, countries that have made strong economic ties with one another have too much to lose to ever go to war with one another. Regardless of whether the statement is true, the conclusions to be drawn are unclear. The global expansion of McDonald's restaurants is a relatively recent phenomenon when put into the context of the history of warfare, and, with a few notable exceptions, has proceeded into relatively stable markets.

Shortly after the book was published, NATO bombed Yugoslavia. On the first day of the bombing, McDonald's restaurants in Belgrade were demolished by the Serbian people and were rebuilt only after the bombing ended. In the 2000 edition of the book, Friedman argued that this exception proved the rule: the war ended quickly, he argued, partly because the Serbian population did not want to lose their place in a global system "symbolized by McDonald's".

Critics have pointed to other conflicts as counterexamples, depending on what one considers "a war":

 The 1989 United States invasion of Panama
 In 1999, India and Pakistan fought a war over Kashmir, known as the Kargil War. Both countries had (and continue to have) McDonald's restaurants. Although the war was not fought in all possible theatres (such as the Rajasthan and Punjab borders), both countries mobilised their military all along their common borders and both countries made threats involving their nuclear capabilities.
 The 2006 war between Israel and Lebanon, following hostilities ongoing since 1973, with South Lebanon occupied until May 2000. (McDonald's franchises were established in Israel and Lebanon in 1993 and 1998, respectively.) However, the Lebanese Armed Forces were not a party to the fighting, the Israel Defense Forces action being taken instead against the paramilitary group Hezbollah.
 The 2008 Russo-Georgian War. Both countries had McDonald's at the time (restaurants began in the two countries in 1990 and 1999, respectively).
 The 2014 Crimean Crisis and War in Donbass between Russia and Ukraine. Both countries had McDonald's at the time. McDonald's closed its restaurants in the Crimean peninsula following the annexation.
 In 2022, Russia launched an invasion of Ukraine, bombing several major cities, including its capital city, Kyiv. At the time, Russia had 847 McDonald's outlets while Ukraine had 108. McDonalds suspended operations in Russia on March 8, 2022. The war later prompted McDonald's to announce, on May 16, 2022, that it would permanently leave Russia.

In the 2000 edition of the book, Friedman countered criticism of his theory as follows:

I was both amazed and amused by how much the Golden Arches Theory had gotten around and how intensely certain people wanted to prove it wrong. They were mostly realists and out-of-work Cold Warriors who insisted that politics, and the never-ending struggle between nation-states, were the immutable defining feature of international affairs, and they were professionally and psychologically threatened by the idea that globalization and economic integration might actually influence geopolitics in some very new and fundamental ways.

He also explains how globalization can cause "Brazilification" — the loss of the middle class and increase in income gap—of countries impacted by the trend. Brazilification is a neologism included in Douglas Coupland's 1991 book Generation X: Tales for an Accelerated Culture. The expression was used in a similar way by the American writer Michael Lind as "Brazilianisation of America" in his book The Next American Nation and by the German sociologist Ulrich Beck as "Brasilianisierung des Westens" in his book Schöne neue Arbeitswelt.

In 2005, Friedman said that he framed this theory in terms of McDonald's Golden Arches "with tongue slightly in cheek". In his 2005 book The World Is Flat he offered an updated theory he labelled the Dell Theory of Conflict Prevention.

See also
Islam and modernity
List of countries with McDonald's franchises
Technocapitalism

Books:
Jihad vs. McWorld
The End of History and the Last Man
The World Is Flat

References

External links
 Official page on author's site
 Review in Policy Review by Holman W. Jenkins, Jr.
 Review in Washington Monthly by Paul Krugman
 Summary on BizSum
 Summary by Tom Allen

1999 non-fiction books
Political books
Sociology books
Books about globalization
Books about foreign relations of the United States